Coleophora narbonensis is a moth of the family Coleophoridae. It is found in France, Hungary and North Macedonia.

References

narbonensis
Moths described in 1990
Moths of Europe